Lagrange stability is a concept in the stability theory of dynamical systems, named after Joseph-Louis Lagrange.

If the negative semi-orbit  is  compact, then the motion is said to be negatively Lagrange stable. The motion through  is said to be Lagrange stable if it is both positively and negatively Lagrange stable.

A dynamical system is said to be positively-/negatively-/Lagrange stable if for each  , the motion  is positively-/negatively-/Lagrange stable, respectively.

References
 Elias P. Gyftopoulos, Lagrange Stability and Liapunov's Direct Method. Proc. of Symposium on Reactor Kinetics and Control, 1963. (PDF)
 

Lagrangian mechanics
Stability theory
Dynamical systems